The 2011 FIVB Volleyball World League was the 22nd edition of the annual men's international volleyball tournament, played by 16 countries from 27 May to 10 July 2011. The Final Round was held in Gdańsk, Poland.

Qualification

Top 14 teams of the 2010 edition directly qualified.
 and  qualified through the qualification.
 replaced , who withdrew from the tournament.
 replaced , who withdrew from the tournament.

Pools composition

Squads

Pool standing procedure

 Match points
 Number of matches won
 Sets ratio
 Points ratio
 Result of the last match between the tied teams

Match won 3–0 or 3–1: 3 match points for the winner, 0 match points for the loser
Match won 3–2: 2 match points for the winner, 1 match point for the loser

Intercontinental round
All times are local.
The top two teams in each pool will qualify for the Final Round. If the Final Round hosts Poland finish lower than second in Pool A, they will still qualify along with the best three second place teams across all four pools.

Pool A

|}

Week 1

|}

Week 2

|}

Week 3

|}

Week 4

|}

Week 5

|}

Week 6

|}

Pool B

|}

Week 1

|}

Week 2

|}

Week 3

|}

Week 4

|}

Week 5

|}

Week 6

|}

Pool C

|}

Week 1

|}

Week 2

|}

Week 3

|}

Week 4

|}

Week 5

|}

Week 6

|}

Pool D

|}

Week 1

|}

Week 2

|}

Week 3

|}

Week 4

|}

Week 5

|}

Week 6

|}

Final round
Venue:  Ergo Arena, Gdańsk, Poland
All times are Central European Summer Time (UTC+02:00).

Pool play

Pool E

|}

|}

Pool F

|}

|}

Final four

Semifinals

|}

3rd place match

|}

Final

|}

Final standing

Awards

Most Valuable Player
  Maxim Mikhaylov
Best Scorer
  Bartosz Kurek
Best Spiker
  Théo Lopes
Best Blocker
  Maxim Mikhaylov

Best Server
  Dmitriy Muserskiy
Best Setter
  Luciano De Cecco
Best Receiver
  Murilo Endres
Best Libero
  Krzysztof Ignaczak

External links
Official website
Final Standing

2011
FIVB World League
Sport in Sopot